Barry James Melrose (born July 15, 1956) is a Canadian–American broadcaster and former professional ice hockey player and head coach. Melrose played in the World Hockey Association (WHA) and National Hockey League (NHL). After retiring from playing, he became a head coach and is best known for being the coach of the Los Angeles Kings in their run to the 1993 Stanley Cup Final. He is a long-time commentator and hockey analyst for ESPN and contributor for the NHL Network.

Hockey career

Playing career
Melrose began his hockey career as a defenceman in the WCHL with the Kamloops Chiefs in 1974, where he stayed for two years. He started the 1976–77 season with the Springfield Indians of the AHL, before moving mid-season to the Cincinnati Stingers of the WHA, where he stayed until 1979.

Following the demise of the WHA and the subsequent absorption of some of its teams into the NHL, Melrose joined the Winnipeg Jets for the 1979–80 season.

For the remainder of his playing career, Melrose split time between the Toronto Maple Leafs and the Detroit Red Wings, as well as their assorted AHL affiliates. Melrose spent his final season playing with the Adirondack Red Wings of the AHL during the 1986–87 season.

During his NHL playing career, he played 300 games, scoring 10 goals, with 23 assists and 728 penalty minutes. He also played in 7 playoff games with the Toronto Maple Leafs, assisting on 2 goals and receiving 38 penalty minutes.

Coaching career
Upon retirement, Melrose immediately began coaching. He coached the 1987–88 season with the Medicine Hat Tigers of the WHL, leading them to a 44–22–6 record and a Memorial Cup title.

He coached the next season with the Seattle Thunderbirds before jumping to the AHL and coaching the Adirondack Red Wings. He spent three years with the Red Wings, leading them to a Calder Cup win in the 1991–92 season.

Beginning with the 1992–93 season, Melrose coached the NHL's Los Angeles Kings, leading them to the 1993 Stanley Cup Final, which they lost to the Montreal Canadiens in five games. He continued coaching the Kings for two more seasons, finishing both years out of the playoffs and with losing records. He then spent 13 years as a hockey analyst with ESPN. (NHL Tonight/DCI Tonight) On June 4, 2008, Melrose stated on Pardon the Interruption that he missed coaching and would entertain any NHL coaching offers. He stated, "I miss not having a dog in the fight."

The Tampa Bay Lightning hired Melrose as their head coach in June 2008. On October 21, 2008, Melrose recorded his first win as a head coach in over 13 years in a 3–2 victory over the Atlanta Thrashers. On November 14, 2008, Melrose was fired by the Lightning with a 5–7–4 record.

ESPN
Melrose joined ESPN in 1996 as a commentator and NHL analyst. He left ESPN in June 2008 to coach the Tampa Bay Lightning. After his short stint with the Lightning ended, he returned to ESPN on January 1, 2009, in conjunction with the Winter Classic played between the Detroit Red Wings and Chicago Blackhawks.

NHL Network
Melrose joined the NHL Network as a contributor in September 2011.

Personal life
Born in Kelvington, Saskatchewan to Norrie and James Melrose, he grew up on a farm outside the town. He is the cousin of former NHL players Wendel Clark and Joe Kocur and longtime minor league forward Kerry Clark. Melrose currently resides in Glens Falls, New York with his wife, Cindy, and the couple have two sons, Tyrell and Adrien. Melrose became an American citizen in March 1998.

He has had several minor television and movie roles. Melrose guest starred in a season 5 episode of Spin City, titled "Hey Judith". He appeared in the second Slapshot movie, Slap Shot 2: Breaking the Ice, as well as the movie Mystery, Alaska with Russell Crowe. During his tenure as the Kings head coach, Melrose was featured in a series of Tony Robbins infomercials.

Career statistics

Coaching record

See also
 Notable families in the NHL
 Playoff mullet

References

External links
 
 Pens Universe: 5 Questions with Barry Melrose

1956 births
Living people
Adirondack Red Wings coaches
Adirondack Red Wings players
Canadian expatriate sportspeople in the United States
Canadian ice hockey defencemen
Canadian people of Scottish descent
Canadian sports announcers
Cincinnati Stingers draft picks
Cincinnati Stingers players
Detroit Red Wings players
Ice hockey people from Saskatchewan
Kamloops Chiefs players
Los Angeles Kings coaches
Medicine Hat Tigers coaches
Montreal Canadiens draft picks
National Hockey League broadcasters
College hockey announcers in the United States
People from Kelvington, Saskatchewan
Seattle Thunderbirds coaches
Sportspeople from Glens Falls, New York
Springfield Indians players
Tampa Bay Lightning coaches
Toronto Maple Leafs players
Weyburn Red Wings players
Winnipeg Jets (1979–1996) players
Canadian ice hockey coaches